The 2019 CS Warsaw Cup was held in November 2019 in Warsaw, Poland. It was part of the 2019–20 ISU Challenger Series. Medals were awarded in the disciplines of men's singles, ladies' singles, pair skating, and ice dance.

Entries 
The International Skating Union published the full list of entries on October 14, 2019.

Changes to preliminary assignments

Results

Men

Ladies

Pairs

Ice dance

References 

Warsaw Cup
CS Warsaw Cup
2019 in Polish sport